Tameka Williams is a sprinter from St Kitts and Nevis. In 2012, she was banned from the Olympic Games for doping offenses. She was set to compete in the Women's 100m and the Women's 200m. Williams admitted to having injected "Blast Off Red", a performance-enhancing drug used on race animals. She has denied taking any illegal substances, what she injected was not listed under the World Anti-Doping Agency banned substances; however the material falls by being under the category of veterinary medicine on the prohibited list.

Achievements

References
 
 

1989 births
Living people
People from Basseterre
Saint Kitts and Nevis female sprinters
Doping cases in athletics
Athletes (track and field) at the 2010 Commonwealth Games
Athletes (track and field) at the 2007 Pan American Games
Athletes (track and field) at the 2011 Pan American Games
Athletes (track and field) at the 2016 Summer Olympics
Olympic athletes of Saint Kitts and Nevis
Commonwealth Games competitors for Saint Kitts and Nevis
Pan American Games competitors for Saint Kitts and Nevis
Olympic female sprinters